The Ministry of Food Processing Industries (MOFPI) is a ministry of the Government of India responsible for formulation and administration of the rules and regulations and laws relating to food processing in India. The ministry was set up in the year 1988, with a view to develop a strong and vibrant food processing industry, to create increased employment in rural sector and enable farmers to reap the benefits of modern technology and to create a surplus for exports and stimulating demand for processed food.  The ministry is currently headed by Pashupati Kumar Paras, a Cabinet Minister.

List of Ministers

List of Ministers of State

Functions of the ministry 
 Policy support and developmental
 Promotional and technical
 Advisory and regulatory

Goals of MOFPI 
 Better utilization and value addition of agricultural produce for enhancement of income of farmers.
 Minimizing wastage at all stages in the food processing chain by the development of infrastructure for storage, transportation and processing of agro-food produce.
 Induction of modern technology into the food processing industries from both domestic and external sources.
 Maximum utilization of agricultural residues and by-products of the primary agricultural produce as also of the processed industry.
 To encourage R&D in food processing for product and process development and improved packaging.
 To provide policy support, promotional initiatives and physical facilities to promote value added exports

Roles of MOFPI 

The strategic role and functions of the Ministry fall under three categories:
 Policy support developmental & promotional
 Technical & advisory
 Regulatory.

It is concerned with the formulation & implementation of policies and plans for all the industries under its domain within the overall national priorities and objectives. Its main focus areas include—development of infrastructure, technological up gradation, development of backward linkages, enforcement of quality standards and expanding domestic as well as export markets for processed food products.

The Ministry acts as a catalyst and facilitator for attracting domestic & foreign investments towards developing large integrated processing capacities, by creating conducive policy environment, including rationalization of taxes & duties. It processes applications for foreign collaborations, Export Oriented Units (EOUs) etc. and assists/guides prospective entrepreneur in his endeavour.

Post liberalization, it has approved a large no. of joint ventures, foreign collaborations, industrial licenses and 100% EOU proposals in different food processing areas and has taken major policy initiatives to facilitate an accelerated growth of the industry. The functions of the Ministry can be broadly classified as follows:

Policy support 
 Formulation and implementation of policies for food processing industries within overall national priorities and objectives.
 Facilitating the creation of a conducive policy environment for healthy growth of the food-processing sector.
 Promoting rationalization of tariffs and duties relating to food processing sector.

Developmental 
 Assistance under various plan schemes such as Mega Food Parks.
 Widening the R&D base in food processing by involvement of various R&D institutes and support to various R&D activities relating to development of product, process and packaging with special emphasis on traditional technologies.
 Human resource development both for entrepreneurs as well as workers engaged in the food processing industry by up gradation of their skills.
 Assistance for setting up analytical and testing laboratories, active participation in the laying down of food standards as well as their harmonization with international standards.

Promotional 
 Assistance for organization of workshops, seminars, exhibitions and fairs etc.
 Assistance for studies / surveys etc.
 Publications and films.

Subjects of the Ministry 
 Fruits and vegetable processing industry
 Food grain milling industry like SOEI FOODS
 Dairy products
 Processing of poultry and eggs, meat and meat products
 Fish processing
 Bread, oilseeds, meals (edible), breakfast foods, malt extract, protein isolate, high protein food, weaning food and extrude/other ready to eat food products.
 Beer, including non-alcoholic beer
 Alcoholic drinks from non-molasses base
 Aerated waters / soft drinks and other processed foods
 Specialized packaging for food processing industries
 Technical assistance and advice to food processing industry

Regulatory 

Earlier the regulatory responsibilities of MoFPI were to implement Fruit Products Order (FPO), However, by the enactment of Food Safety and Standards Act, 2006, these regulatory responsibilities are transferred to Food Safety Authority of India, New Delhi which is under control of Ministry of Health and Family Welfare.

Relevant agencies 

For achieving its objectives, the Ministry, apart from various Ministries of the Government of India like Agriculture, Industry, Commerce and Health interacts with various State Governments through their Ministries / Ministry of Food Processing Industries or nominated nodal agencies which are responsible for implementing programs relating to this sector in the concerned State Governments.

The Ministry also interacts with various promotional organizations like
 Agricultural & Processed Food and Export Development Authority (APEDA)
 Marine Products Export Development Authority (MPEDA)
 Coffee Board
 Tea Board
 Cashew Board
 National Research Development corporation (NRDC)
 National Cooperative Development Corporation
 National Horticulture Board
 Forum of Indian Food Importers President, Forum of Indian food Importers Amit Lohani

References

External links
 Ministry of Food Processing Industries
 National Horticulture Board
 Agricultural and Processed Food Products Export Development Authority
 Cashew Export Promotion Council of India
 National Cooperative Development Corporation
 Coffee Board of India

 
Food Processing Industries
India
Food processing industry in India